Pope Alexander IV (r. 1254–61) created two cardinals in two consistories during his pontificate.

August 1255
There are sources that pinpoint this allocation as having taken place over the course of some months but there is no definitive date for it.
 Riccardo di Montecassino O.S.B.

December 1255
 Tesauro dei Beccheria O.S.B. Vall.

Notes and references

Sources

College of Cardinals
Alexander IV
Alex
13th-century Catholicism